Pekka Lehtosaari (born 10 February 1961) is a Finnish film director and screenwriter. He is best known for directing Finnish-language dubbings of international films, starting with The Rescuers Down Under in 1990. He directed the Finnish dubbing of My Neighbor Totoro.

Movies 
 Santa Claus and the Magic Drum (1996), directing.
 Bad Boys (2003), screenwriting.
 Vares (2004), screenwriting.
 Quest for a Heart (2007), screenwriting, directing.
 Dark Floors (2008), screenwriting.

References 

1961 births
Living people
Finnish film directors
Finnish screenwriters
Finnish male voice actors
Finnish voice directors